Bokštai is a village in Kėdainiai district municipality, in Kaunas County, in central Lithuania. According to the 2011 census, the village has a population of 105 people. The village is located by the Dotnuvėlė river (Akademija pond) and the regional road Jonava-Šeduva.

Formerly this location was known as Kemėšìškiai or Grigoriškiai.

Demography

References

Villages in Kaunas County
Kėdainiai District Municipality